Jussi Vasara (born 14 May 1987) is a retired Finnish footballer who most recently played for Finnish Veikkausliiga club Seinäjoen Jalkapallokerho.

International career
Vasara represented Finland U21 in the Under 21 European Championships in 2009. He made two crucial goals as a substitute in his U-21 debut match against Austria in the qualifying play-off second leg to take the tie into extra time. Vasara was chosen to the Veikkausliiga team of the Month for September 2014. In January 2015 he signed two-year deal with Seinäjoen Jalkapallokerho.

Personal
He is the younger brother of former Finland international player Vesa Vasara.

References

External links
 Jussi Vasara at FC Honka 
 
 

1987 births
Living people
Finnish footballers
Finland under-21 international footballers
Finland youth international footballers
Veikkausliiga players
FC Honka players
Klubi 04 players
Seinäjoen Jalkapallokerho players
Association football midfielders
Footballers from Helsinki